Georgios Skartados (Greek: Γεώργιος Σκαρτάδος; born 7 April 1960) is a retired Greek international footballer.

Career
Born in Rhodes, Skartados started his career at local club Rodos F.C. In the summer of 1982, he joined PAOK and played mainly as a midfielder for 256 league games and scored 84 goals, including the national championship in 1985. He was also a regular for the Greek national side.

In 1992, Skartados moved to Iraklis, and then in 1995 he moved to PAOK's traditional rivals Olympiacos F.C.

Honours

Club
PAOK
Alpha Ethniki: 1984–85

Olympiacos
Alpha Ethniki: 1996–97

Individual
PSAP Superleague Best Greek Player: 1994–95

References

External links
 

1960 births
Living people
Greek footballers
Greece international footballers
Super League Greece players
Rodos F.C. players
PAOK FC players
Iraklis Thessaloniki F.C. players
Olympiacos F.C. players
Association football midfielders
People from Rhodes
Sportspeople from the South Aegean